The County of Minburn No. 27 is a municipal district in east central Alberta, Canada. Its municipal office is located in the Town of Vegreville. Located in Census Division No. 10, the County of Minburn No. 27 was formed as a county on January 1, 1965, from the former Municipal District of Minburn No. 72.

Geography

Communities and localities 
 
The following urban municipalities are surrounded by the County of Minburn No. 27.
Cities
none
Towns
Vegreville
Villages
Innisfree
Mannville
Summer villages
none

The following hamlets are located within the County of Minburn No. 27.
Hamlets
Lavoy (dissolved from village status in 1999)
Minburn (dissolved from village status in 2015)
Ranfurly

The following localities are located within the County of Minburn No. 27.
Localities 
Brookwood Estates
Chailey
Cummings
Fitzallen
Inland
Lake Geneva
New Kiew
Prairie Lodge Trailer Court (designated place)
Royal Park
Warwick
Other places
Brush Hill

Demographics 

In the 2016 Census of Population conducted by Statistics Canada, the County of Minburn No. 27 had a population of 3,188 living in 1,184 of its 1,380 total private dwellings, a  change from its 2011 population of 3,383.

See also 
List of communities in Alberta
List of municipal districts in Alberta

References

External links 
 County of Minburn

 
Minburn